Club de Deportes Quintero Unido is a Chilean Football club, their home town is Quintero, Chile.

The club was founded on June 10, 1962 and participated for 5 years in Primera B, 12 years in Tercera División A and 2 seasons in Tercera División B.

Seasons played
5 seasons in Primera B
12 seasons in Tercera División A
2 seasons in Tercera División B

See also
Chilean football league system

Football clubs in Chile
Association football clubs established in 1962
1962 establishments in Chile